John Scot Barrowman  (born 11 March 1967) is a Scottish-American actor, author, presenter, singer and comic book writer. He is known for his role as Captain Jack Harkness in Doctor Who and Torchwood, and as Malcolm Merlyn in the Arrowverse.

Born in Glasgow, Barrowman moved to the US state of Illinois with his family at the age of eight. Encouraged by his high school teachers there, he studied performing arts at the United States International University in San Diego before landing the role of Billy Crocker in Cole Porter's Anything Goes in London's West End. Since his debut, he has played lead roles in various musicals both in the West End and on Broadway, including Miss Saigon, The Phantom of the Opera, Sunset Boulevard, and Matador. After appearing in Sam Mendes' production of The Fix, he was nominated for the 1998 Laurence Olivier Award for Best Actor in a Musical and, in the early 2000s, returned to the role of Billy Crocker in the revival of Anything Goes. His most recent West End credit was in the 2009 production of La Cage aux Folles.

Alongside his theatrical career, Barrowman has appeared in films such as the musical biopic De-Lovely (2004) and musical comedy The Producers (2005). Before venturing into British television, he featured in the American television dramas Titans and Central Park West, but is better known for his acting and presenting work for the BBC; this includes his work for CBBC in its earlier years, his self-produced entertainment programme Tonight's the Night, and his BAFTA Cymru-nominated role of Captain Jack Harkness in the 2005 revival of the sci-fi series Doctor Who and its spin-off Torchwood. Barrowman has also had a number of guest roles in television programmes both in the US and the UK. He appeared as a contestant on the first series of celebrity ice skating show Dancing on Ice while his theatrical background allowed him to become a judge on Andrew Lloyd Webber's musical talent shows How Do You Solve a Problem like Maria?, Any Dream Will Do and I'd Do Anything. With this experience, he joined the judging panel of Dancing on Ice for the 2020 to 2021 series. In 2006, he was voted Stonewall's Entertainer of the Year. He hosted the BBC One quiz show Pressure Pad in 2013 and 2014. Barrowman starred in The CW's Arrow and Legends of Tomorrow as Malcolm Merlyn.

Barrowman is also featured on more than 12 musical theatre recordings, including cover tunes found on his 2007 album Another Side and 2008's Music Music Music. Both albums accrued places on the UK Albums Chart, as did his self-titled John Barrowman (2010), which reached No. 11, his highest chart placing to date. He has published two memoirs and autobiographies, Anything Goes (2008) and I Am What I Am (2009), with his older sister Carole as co-author. The siblings also teamed up to write a series of young-adult fantasy novels, Hollow Earth.  The second book in the series, Bone Quill, was released 2013, with the third, Book of Beasts published in 2014. A second trilogy, The Orion Chronicles, followed with Conjuror published in 2016, Nephilim in 2017, and Inquisitor in 2018.

Early life
John Scot Barrowman was born in Mount Vernon, Glasgow, on 11 March 1967, the youngest of three children. His older sister, Carole, later became a university professor. He lived in Glasgow for the first eight years of his life. His mother was a singer who also worked in a record shop, while his father was employed by the Caterpillar heavy machinery company in nearby Uddingston. In 1975, his father's company relocated the family to the United States, where his father managed the Caterpillar tractor factory in Aurora, Illinois. The family settled in Joliet, Illinois, where Barrowman attended Joliet West High School in the heart of a "quintessentially middle-class conservative town". His high school music and English teachers changed the future course of his life, with his music tutor instilling in him a love for performing, and his English teacher encouraging him to rise to his true artistic potential. His English teacher moved him into a programme for gifted children and coached him for the school's speech team. With the support of his teacher, he competed with other schools in statewide speech competitions, where he sharpened his skills reading scenes from plays.

After his classmates mocked his native Scottish accent, Barrowman learned to speak with a General American accent which also hinted at a Mid-Atlantic accent. As a freshman, he won parts in several musical productions; from 1983 to 1986, he performed in such musical productions as Oliver!, Camelot, Hello, Dolly!, Li'l Abner, and Anything Goes. Among his classmates in high school, who also participated in theater with him, were Anthony Rapp and Andy Dick. Rapp is reportedly a close friend of Barrowman. Barrowman has acknowledged that, without the support he received in high school, he would most likely "not now be appearing in royal command performances in the West End in front of the Royal Family or having Stephen Sondheim ask [him] to play opposite Carol Burnett". Barrowman spent his senior year shovelling coal for an Illinois power company. His father had arranged the job (and similar jobs for his brother and sister) to give him the experience of manual labour. His father told him, "If you want to do manual labour for the rest of your life, you'll know that when you do it; it's a choice. But if you don't like it, you'll understand the importance of educating yourself and–if you decide what you want to do–being good at your craft or your skill." Barrowman worked for the power company for the entire summer, but did not like the job. Eventually, he convinced the company to move him to work in the storeroom.

Barrowman graduated from high school in 1985, and he later became a naturalised U.S. citizen while retaining his British citizenship. After he graduated from high school, he attended the University of Iowa for a semester to study drama and music. He then attended DePaul University, studying voice for a semester, before performing at the Opryland theme park in Nashville, Tennessee for two summer seasons. He then transferred to the United States International University in January 1988, where he studied performing arts. As part of an student exchange programme, he returned to his native Britain in the summer of 1989 to study Shakespeare for six months, where he remained.

Acting career

Theatre

Barrowman's professional acting career began in London's West End in October 1989, playing the role of Billy Crocker in Cole Porter's Anything Goes at the Prince Edward Theatre, alongside Elaine Paige as Reno Sweeney and Bernard Cribbins as Moonface Martin. He continued to appear in West End productions for the next decade, taking the title role of Domingo Hernandez in Matador at the Queen's Theatre in 1991; as Raoul in The Phantom of the Opera at Her Majesty's Theatre in 1992; as Claude in Hair at the Old Vic Theatre in 1993; as Chris in Miss Saigon at the Theatre Royal, Drury Lane in 1993; as Joe Gillis in Sunset Boulevard at the Adelphi Theatre from 1994 to 1995; and as Beast in Beauty and the Beast at the Dominion Theatre in 1999.

Barrowman was part of the musical Godspell in 1994, and was a soloist in two songs, "We Beseech Thee" and "On The Willows". He was lead vocalist on a rendition of Strike Up the Band in Who Could Ask for Anything More? A Celebration of Ira Gershwin at the Royal Albert Hall in 1996, and he was nominated for an Olivier Award for Best Actor in a Musical in 1998 for originating the role of Cal Chandler in The Fix, a performance he repeated in Cameron Mackintosh's 1998 gala concert Hey, Mr Producer!. Barrowman played Joe Gillis in Sunset Boulevard in the West End and, briefly, on Broadway. His only other Broadway credit is in the role of Barry in the Stephen Sondheim revue Putting It Together (1999–2000) at the Ethel Barrymore Theatre opposite Carol Burnett and George Hearn. In a review of Putting It Together, theatre critic Tom Samiljan noted Barrowman's "fine baritone voice and suave looks". In 2002, Barrowman appeared as Bobby in Sondheim's Company in the Kennedy Center's Stephen Sondheim Celebration.

Barrowman returned to the role of Billy Crocker in Trevor Nunn's 2003 West End revival of Anything Goes, and appeared in West End non-musical dramas, such as his role as Wyndham Brandon in Rope at the Minerva Theatre, Chichester in 1993, and he starred as Lieutenant Jack Ross opposite Rob Lowe in the 2005 production of A Few Good Men.

Barrowman starred in pantomime productions of Cinderella at the New Wimbledon Theatre (Christmas, 2005–06) and in Jack and the Beanstalk at Cardiff's New Theatre (Christmas, 2006–07). He played the title role in Aladdin at the Birmingham Hippodrome over Christmas 2007–8 and as a guest act for the Royal Variety Performance at the London Palladium in 2008. Barrowman played the lead in the Robin Hood pantomime at the Birmingham Hippodrome for the 2008–09 season. He presented Andrew Lloyd Webber's 60th birthday party in London's Hyde Park on 14 September 2008. Exactly one year later, Barrowman succeeded Roger Allam as Zaza/Albin in the West End revival of La Cage aux Folles, at the Playhouse Theatre.

Television presenter
 Barrowman was one of the original hosts of Live & Kicking, a children's Saturday morning variety show on the BBC. During this time, he became known for his catchphrase, "it's a dirty rat!", which he used during a phone-in game set in a haunted house. From 1993 to 1994, Barrowman reported on technology news as the host of the Electric Circus segment of the show. He appeared on the children's television game show, The Movie Game from 1994 to 1996, taking over from Jonathon Morris.

Barrowman was one of the regular presenters on Channel 5's afternoon show 5's Company from 1997 to 1999. Barrowman read bedtime stories on the CBeebies channel between 1 and 5 May 2006. That summer, Barrowman was on a Judges panel with Andrew Lloyd Webber, David Ian, and Zoe Tyler on BBC One's music talent show How Do You Solve a Problem like Maria?.

In the same year, Barrowman made two television appearances on New Year's Eve: He talked about spirituality and civil partnerships on BBC Television's Heaven & Earth, hosted by Gloria Hunniford, and he appeared as a guest on Graham Norton's one-off BBC Television programme, The Big Finish, teaming up with Craig Revel Horwood and Louis Walsh to take a lighthearted look at news stories in 2006. On 11 February 2007, Barrowman co-presented coverage of the BAFTA Film Awards, along with Ruby Wax for E!: Entertainment Television. On 11 and 18 February 2007, Barrowman guest-presented two editions of Elaine Paige on Sunday, a pre-recorded BBC Radio 2 weekly musical theatre and film music showcase.

In 2007, Barrowman was a judge on the BBC One TV series Any Dream Will Do, hosted by Graham Norton. The show searched for a new, unknown actor to play the role of Joseph in a West End revival of the Andrew Lloyd Webber musical Joseph and the Amazing Technicolor Dreamcoat, eventually choosing Lee Mead. He guested on the BBC Two comedy panel quiz show Never Mind the Buzzcocks (Series 19, Episode 5), challenging host Simon Amstell to a "gay-off". He also guested on Al Murray's Happy Hour, The Charlotte Church Show, and Friday Night with Jonathan Ross.

On 27 July 2007, Barrowman guest hosted The Friday Night Project, on Channel 4. In 2008 Barrowman presented a primetime BBC game show called The Kids Are All Right. On the show, four adults compete against seven "smart and sassy" children for cash in four rounds "testing their brainpower, knowledge and speed of response". On 16 and 23 February 2008, he presented the National Lottery Draw.

On 1 March 2008, Barrowman appeared as a panellist of the Eurovision Song Contest selection show, Eurovision: Your Decision on BBC 1 with Carrie Grant and Terry Wogan.  From 29 April to 1 May, he presented This Morning. Barrowman began featuring as a judge on the Canadian version of How Do You Solve a Problem Like Maria? in June 2008. In 2008, Barrowman became the presenter for Animals at Work, a children's television show on CBBC that showcases "animals with extraordinary skills that make people's lives easier and safer"; Animals at Work began in 2009 with 26 episodes. In February 2010, Barrowman appeared as a guest host on UK shopping channel QVC

In 2011, Barrowman guest hosted the Christmas special of Never Mind the Buzzcocks (Series 25, Episode 12). In 2012, Barrowman guest presented three episodes of This Morning with Kate Thornton. In July 2012, Barrowman co-hosted the G4's 2012 Live Comic Con in San Diego with Candace Bailey. In 2013, Barrowman began hosting the BBC One game show Pressure Pad and in 2014, he hosted Channel 4 show Superstar Dogs: Countdown to Crufts, which began airing on 17 February 2014. In 2014, Barrowman hosted the Channel 4 programme Small Animal Hospital and in October 2016, he was a guest team captain for an episode of Celebrity Juice and he guest presented an episode of The One Show.

Prime time drama
Barrowman's television career began with several appearances in short-lived prime-time soap operas. Barrowman first starred as Peter Fairchild in Central Park West (1995) a show American film critic Ken Tucker calls "a tale of ritzy, ditsy New York City careerists—some struggling to make it, others plotting to retain their status and power." Television critic David Hiltbrand called Barrowman's character a "Prince Charming ... a virtuous, hardworking assistant DA who keeps getting distracted by women who swoon in his path." Tucker noted Barrowman's character of Peter Fairchild to be "physically an eye-widening cross between John Kennedy Jr. and Hugh Grant". The show lasted for two seasons on CBS, from September 1995 to June 1996. Barrowman then appeared as Peter Williams in Titans (2000). According to writer Joanna Bober, in Titans, Barrowman plays a "ruthless mogul" who gains "control of the family's private aviation company (a fleet of 'Titans') from his semi-retired father" while increasing the profitability of the company amidst a series of soap opera intrigues. Titans was cancelled after airing eleven episodes. Barrowman was also considered for the role of Will in Will and Grace, but the producers reportedly felt he was "too straight" and the role eventually went to straight actor Eric McCormack instead.  Commenting on the decision, Barrowman remarked, "The sad thing is it's run by gay men and women."

On 25 March 2008, Barrowman made a guest appearance in episode 22 of the BBC's Hotel Babylon. Entertainment Weekly reported that Barrowman would appear in the 2010 season of Desperate Housewives, "for a minimum of five episodes, portraying Patrick Logan, the ex-boyfriend at the center of the Angie Bolen (Drea de Matteo) mystery." On 23 February 2010 Barrowman announced on The One Show that his contract had been extended to a total of six episodes.

Barrowman starred in the ABC drama series pilot Gilded Lillys created and produced by Shonda Rhimes.

Since 2012, Barrowman has portrayed Malcolm Merlyn, one of the main antagonists in The CW series Arrow. Barrowman was a recurring cast member for the first two seasons and was promoted to a main cast member beginning with the third season. By July 2016, he signed a deal that allows him to continue being a series regular on Arrow as well as the other superhero shows produced by Greg Berlanti, including The Flash and Legends of Tomorrow. In the Flash third-season episode "Duet", he plays gangster Cutter Moran in the dreamworld the Music Meister sets up. Despite announcing in May 2017 that he is leaving the Arrowverse television franchise, Barrowman returned as Malcolm Merlyn in the second part of the Elseworlds crossover, hallucinated by Barry Allen, situated in a universe rewritten by the Book of Destiny where Allen is perceived to be Oliver Queen. When reality is rewritten again, Merlyn is situated as a Central City Police officer who arrests Barry and Oliver, rewritten as the Trigger Twins.

Film and reality television
Barrowman appeared as Ben Carpenter in the low-budget film Shark Attack 3: Megalodon (2002). His musical abilities are featured in several film roles:  as Jack in the Cole Porter biopic De-Lovely (2004), singing a duet with Kevin Kline on the song "Night and Day"; and as the lead tenor Stormtrooper in The Producers (2005), singing "Springtime for Hitler". Barrowman co-presented and performed in the BBC One series The Sound of Musicals (2006).

Barrowman took part in the reality television series Dancing on Ice on ITV1 in January and February 2006.  Resembling a real ice skating competition, ice dancers Jayne Torvill and Christopher Dean trained celebrities to compete on the show. His skating partner was World Junior Gold Medalist and three-time Russian champion Olga Sharutenko. On 4 February, despite being one of the favourites to win, Barrowman and Sharutenko faced Stefan Booth and his partner Kristina Lenko in the skate off and were eliminated by the judges' by a vote of 3 to 2. He was one of five celebrity guests on the Strictly Come Dancing Christmas Special (2010), and achieved both the top score and also first place when the audience vote had been counted. His professional partner was Kristina Rihanoff and they danced the Quickstep. In September 2012 Barrowman was a guest host on Attack of the Show!.

On 12 November 2018, Barrowman was confirmed to be participating in that year's series of I'm a Celebrity...Get Me Out of Here!. He eventually finished third behind Emily Atack and Harry Redknapp.

Also in 2018, Barrowman provided the voice of the villainous Hollywood star Flex Dexter in Fireman Sam: Set for Action! a special of the Welsh long running children's animated series. He got the role when he was introduced to his friend's partner who was a Mattel employee at a restaurant in Palm Springs, California.

Doctor Who and Torchwood
Barrowman played recurring guest character Captain Jack Harkness, a pansexual time traveller from the 51st century in the BBC science fiction drama Doctor Who when the series was revived in 2005. His first appearance as Harkness was in the two-part story "The Empty Child"/"The Doctor Dances". He went on to appear in the next three episodes, "Boom Town", "Bad Wolf" and "The Parting of the Ways". Jack became so popular, he was given his own show – Torchwood, a Doctor Who spin-off series featuring a team of alien hunters based in modern-day Cardiff, which premiered in 2006. American film and television critic Ken Tucker describes Barrowman's role on Torchwood as "dashing", "utterly fabulous", "celestially promiscuous", and "like Tom Cruise with suspenders, but minus the Scientology". In the show, Jack "tracks down—and occasionally beds—ETs with the help of his quartet of bedazzled groupies—slash—Experts in Their Fields: One's a doctor, one's a cop, one's a scientist, and one... makes coffee and late nights piping hot. It's like the Justice League of Extended-Pinkie Nerds."

Barrowman continued to guest star in Doctor Who in 2007, appearing in "Utopia", "The Sound of Drums", and "Last of the Time Lords". He also participated in a Doctor Who special on the BBC's The Weakest Link. In 2008, Barrowman appeared in the two-part 2008 series finale, "The Stolen Earth"/"Journey's End" and reprised the role of Captain Jack Harkness in the "Doctor Who: Tonight's the Night" special. In 2010, Barrowman returned to Doctor Who with a cameo in "The End of Time" along with other previous stars.

Series 3 of Torchwood was broadcast in July 2009 as a miniseries of five episodes called Children of Earth. Filming of Series 4 called Torchwood: Miracle Day began on 11 January 2011 primarily in Los Angeles, and in and around Cardiff, Wales. The first episode of Miracle Day aired on Starz Network in the United States on 8 July 2011 and was broadcast on BBC One in the UK on 14 July 2011. Both Doctor Who and Torchwood became popular in the United States on the BBC America network. In November 2013 he appeared in the one-off 50th anniversary comedy homage The Five(ish) Doctors Reboot. Since 2015 he has continued to appear in an ongoing series of Torchwood audio plays for Big Finish Productions. In January 2020, Barrowman made a surprise appearance in "Fugitive of the Judoon", the fifth episode of the show's twelfth series. He appeared again in the 2021 New Year's Day special "Revolution of the Daleks".

Other 
In 2014, he performed in the opening ceremony of the 2014 Commonwealth Games in Glasgow, Scotland.

Books
Barrowman's memoir and autobiography, Anything Goes, was published in 2008 by Michael O'Mara Books. His sister, English professor and journalist Carole Barrowman, helped write the book using her brother's dictations. In 2009, Barrowman published I Am What I Am, his second memoir detailing his recent television work and musings on fame.

Barrowman's first published work of original fiction was a Torchwood comic strip, titled Captain Jack and the Selkie, co-written with sister Carole. Commenting on the characterisation of Jack Harkness in the comic strip Barrowman states: "We'd already agreed to tell a story that showed a side of Jack and a part of his history that hadn't been explored too much in other media. I wanted to give fans something original about Jack." This was followed by a series of Torchwood comics, published by Titan Comics between 2010 and 2017.  Barrowman's début fantasy novel titled Hollow Earth, co-written with his sister Carole, was published in the United Kingdom on 2 February 2012 by Buster Books. The novel is about twins Matt and Emily ("Em") Calder who share an ability that allows them to make artwork come to life, due to their powerful imaginations. Their ability is sought after by antagonists who wish to use it to breach Hollow Earth—a realm in which all demons and monsters are trapped. Two sequels from the same team concerning Hollow Earth followed – The Bone Quill (2013) and The Book of Beasts (2014).  This was followed by a second trilogy (the Orion Chronicles) continuing the adventures of Matt and Em, in Conjuror (2016), Nephilim (2017) and Inquisitor (2018).  They also published a novel featuring Captain Jack, Torchwood: Exodus Code  in 2012.  In 2018, John and Carole Barrowman teamed up with Legendary Comics and graphic novelist Erika Lewis to create Acursian, featuring a modern-day anti-hero dealing with Celtic mythology.

Charity and activism
Barrowman worked with Stonewall, a gay rights organisation in the UK, on the "Education for All" campaign against homophobia in schools. In April 2008, the group placed posters on 600 billboards that read, "Some people are gay. Get over it!" Barrowman contributed his support to the project asking people to join him: "Help exterminate homophobia. Be bold. Be brave. Be a buddy, not a bully." That same month, Barrowman spoke at the Oxford Union about his career, the entertainment industry, and gay rights issues. The event was filmed for the BBC programme The Making of Me, in an episode exploring the science of homosexuality. He was voted Entertainer of the Year in 2006 by Stonewall, and placed on the "Out 100" list for 2008, an annual list of notable LGBT people compiled by Out magazine. In June 2010, Barrowman met with then-Conservative Party leader and Prime Minister David Cameron as a representative of the LGBT community.

Barrowman was one of 48 British celebrities who signed a public notice warning voters against Conservative Party policy towards the BBC prior to the 2010 general election. In the 2012 presidential election, Barrowman endorsed Democratic Party candidate Barack Obama, who was running for re-election. Barrowman publicly supported Scotland remaining in the United Kingdom in the 2014 Scottish independence referendum, and was one of 200 public figures who were signatories to a letter to The Guardian opposing Scottish independence.

Personal life

Barrowman is known for speaking in his American accent while in public but switching back to his original Scottish accent when with his family. This was first publicly revealed when he visited his parents during the making of his 2008 documentary The Making of Me. He also uses it when in Scotland (including during the Glasgow Commonwealth Games opening ceremony) and when speaking to another Scottish person.

Barrowman met his husband, Scott Gill, after Gill came to see Barrowman in a production of Rope at the Chichester Festival Theatre in 1993. They split their time between homes in London, Cardiff, and Palm Springs, California. They entered into a civil partnership on 27 December 2006. A small ceremony was held in Cardiff with friends and family, with the cast of Torchwood and executive producer Russell T Davies as guests. The pair were legally married in California on 2 July 2013, following the Supreme Court's decision to deny an appeal against the reversal of California Proposition 8.

In 2011, Barrowman released his own skin care line, titled HIM.

In mid-March 2017, Barrowman and Gill held a "big bad garage sale" in their Palm Springs home, in which they sold Doctor Who and Torchwood memorabilia. Neighbours and fans showed up for the occasion, with Barrowman documenting most of the day on his social media accounts.

Sexual misconduct allegations
In February 2008, talking about Barrowman's on-set behaviour, Doctor Who co-star Freema Agyeman said in an interview to The London Paper newspaper, "John will walk about with his chap [penis] hanging out, having conversations with people."

On 30 November 2008, Barrowman allegedly exposed himself during an episode of Radio 1's Switch programme. Although the act was not seen, as a show staff member had the webcam, the BBC and Barrowman subsequently apologised for any offence caused.

In a 2018 Playbill article, Barrowman publicly revealed that during a performance of Sunset Boulevard, he had exposed himself while standing behind a piano. Though hidden from the audience, it was in clear view of the actors on stage. This prompted a letter from the show's composer, Andrew Lloyd Webber, warning him to not "upstage the score with his appendage."

Following accusations of sexual harassment from 20 women against fellow Doctor Who star Noel Clarke in April 2021, a video from a 2015 science-fiction convention surfaced wherein Clarke and co-stars Camille Coduri and Annette Badland discuss the episode "Boom Town", which was filmed in February 2005, and reference Barrowman exposing himself. Julie Gardner, an executive producer on Doctor Who and Torchwood, confirmed that she received a complaint about Barrowman's on-set behaviour "around 2008", for which he was reprimanded at the time.

On 7 May 2021, Barrowman issued a statement that read:

 
As a result of the allegations, a video featuring Barrowman was removed from the Doctor Who: Time Fracture theatre show, Big Finish removed the Torchwood release "Absent Friends" from pre-order and their release schedule, and Titan Comics shelved a graphic novel that was set to feature Captain Jack Harkness.

On 23 November 2021, Barrowman appeared on the daytime TV show Lorraine. With regards to the above, Barrowman stated "I think if it was now it would be crossing the line. Fifteen years ago was bawdy behaviour [...] the fact it was stories I've already told, haven't hidden anything [...] they've tried to turn them into sexual harassment which it absolutely is not. All the people that are making a fuss about it: they weren't there, they don't know the context of things that were done. Like I've said, I would never do it now."

Filmography

Film

Television

Video games

Theatre and concerts

Discography

Studio albums

Compilation albums

Box set

Cast recordings

Performs two songs in The Flash episode, "Duet".

Soundtracks

Other appearances

Home DVD releases
 An Evening With John Barrowman (2009)
 John Barrowman: Live at the Royal Albert Hall (2010)
John Barrowman: Collectors Edition- 2 disc DVD set

Honours
 Barrowman was appointed Member of the Order of the British Empire (MBE) in the 2014 Birthday Honours for services to light entertainment and charity.
 In July 2011, Barrowman was awarded an honorary degree from the Royal Conservatoire of Scotland.
 Human Rights Campaign Visibility Award on 5 November 2016 for advocating on behalf of the LGBTQ community, including equality and justice for LGBTQ youth.

Awards and nominations

References

Further reading

External links

John Barrowman on Magic 105.4 FM
Hollow Earth Website

John Barrowman at InBaseline
Interview with Barrowman at AfterElton.com
John Barrowman's How Do You Solve A Problem Like A Maria? profile
Downstage Center interview at American Theatre Wing website

1967 births
20th-century Scottish LGBT people
21st-century Scottish LGBT people
Living people
Members of the Order of the British Empire
Male actors from Glasgow
Scottish emigrants to the United States
Scottish children's writers
21st-century British novelists
21st-century Scottish male singers
Scottish fantasy writers
Scottish male film actors
Scottish male musical theatre actors
Scottish male television actors
Scottish television presenters
Scottish male video game actors
American male film actors
American male stage actors
American male television actors
American male video game actors
United States International University alumni
British writers of young adult literature
Musicians from Joliet, Illinois
American LGBT novelists
American gay actors
American LGBT singers
Scottish LGBT broadcasters
Scottish LGBT singers
Scottish LGBT novelists
Scottish LGBT rights activists
American LGBT rights activists
Actors from Joliet, Illinois
Scottish male novelists
American male novelists
People with acquired American citizenship
21st-century American male writers
I'm a Celebrity...Get Me Out of Here! (British TV series) participants
Gay singers
Gay novelists
Scottish gay musicians
Scottish gay actors
American gay writers